Oltressenda Alta is a comune (municipality) in the Province of Bergamo in the Italian region of Lombardy, located about  northeast of Milan and about  northeast of Bergamo.

Oltressenda Alta borders the following municipalities: Ardesio, Clusone, Gromo, Rovetta, Villa d'Ogna, Vilminore di Scalve, Oltressenda alta has two majority localities: Nasolino and Valzurio.

Demographic evolution

References